The Fort Smith Airport  is located near Fort Smith, Northwest Territories, Canada. Runway 03/21 has no winter service.

The Fort Smith (District) Heliport is located southeast of the airport.

Airlines and destinations

Passenger

References

External links

Certified airports in the South Slave Region